Sterlite Technologies Limited (Formerly Sterlite Tech) is an Indian multinational technology company, headquartered in Mumbai. It is listed on Bombay Stock Exchange and National Stock Exchange of India. It has 636 patents and is active in over 150 countries. The company is specialized in optical fiber and cables, hyper-scale network design, and deployment and network software.

STL has also partnered with other industry entities to design, build and manage such cloud-native software-defined network. It also has offices in China, US, SEA, Europe and MEA. It has facilities in India, Italy, China and Brazil and two software-development centres. To give a boost to Indian government make in India initiative, STL recently invested in 5G assembling an ecosystem of partners.

It has the first optical fiber cable plant in India to receive zero waste to landfill certification

Business acquisition 

 On 24 September 2015, Sterlite Technologies Limited acquired Elitecore Technologies in an all cash deal worth 180 crore.
 On 20 July 2018, Sterlite Technologies Limited subsidiary Sterlite Global Venture acquired Metallurgica Bresciana in an all cash deal worth €47 million.
 On 26 September 2019, Sterlite Technologies Limited subsidiary Sterlite Global Venture acquired Impact Data Solutions (IDS) Group for an enterprise value of $15 million.
 On 9 January 2020, Sterlite Technologies Limited acquired 12.8% stake in Israel-based ASOCS.
 On 2 November 2020, Sterlite Technologies Limited acquired 100% stake in Optotec S.p.A, a leading optical interconnect company at an enterprise value of €29 million.

Geographical presence 
STL has 20+ sales and marketing offices, 6 manufacturing units and state of the art development centres across the world as of March 31, 2018, with major presence in India, United States, China, Brazil, Italy, Middle East and Europe

Initiatives 
Jeewan Jyoti Women Empowerment Programme (JJWEP)

In 2014, STL established the Jeewan Jyoti Women Empowerment Programme (JJWEP), to bring about gender equality, create decent work opportunities, economic growth, and thus, alleviation of poverty in several villages

Medical Mobile Unit (MMU)

STL initiated MMU programme in partnership with Indian red cross society across 24 remote villages

Awards and recognitions 

 In 2019, STL is awarded at ET CIO annual conclave

Controversies 

In 2002, Sterlite Technologies Limited was the subject of a major lawsuit, by Fitel USA, a subsidiary of Furukawa Electric charging Sterlite Technologies Limited with infringement of a number of optical fiber patents including those related to manufacturing fiber with low polarization mode dispersion. This lawsuit was settled in Jan 2010.

References

External links 
Amended F-1 registration statement for Sterlite Industries (India) Limited filed with the U.S. Securities and Exchange Commission

Glassmaking companies of India
Electronics companies of India
Manufacturing companies based in Mumbai
Indian companies established in 1988
Indian brands
1988 establishments in Maharashtra
Manufacturing companies established in 1988
Companies listed on the National Stock Exchange of India
Companies listed on the Bombay Stock Exchange